Kentropyx borckiana, commonly known as the Guyana kentropyx, is a species of lizard in the family Teiidae. The species is endemic to northeastern South America.

Geographic range
Kentropyx borckiana is found in Guyana, French Guiana, Suriname, and on the Caribbean island of Barbados.

Parthenogenesis
K. borckiana is apparently a rare unisexual clone that reproduces through parthenogenesis, in that only 100 female museum specimens are known to exist and no male specimens.  It is believed to have arisen from hybridization between Kentropyx calcarata and Kentropyx striata.

Etymology
The specific name, borckiana, is in honor of Johann Graf von Borcke (1781-1862), a major in the Prussian Army who fought in the Napoleonic Wars. Borcke presented a number of specimens to the Berlin Museum.

Description
Kentropyx borckiana grows up to  snout-to-vent.  Its head and neck are greenish, with white underneath.  Its sides are brown, and its underbody is pinkish.  Its dorsal surface is gray to pinkish-brown, with light lateral stripes bordered with dark bands.

Similar species
A population of lizards on Trinidad was originally thought to be K. borckiana, but has since been identified as another species.

References

Further reading

Cole, Charles J.; Dessauer, Herbert C.; Townsend, Carol R.; Arnold, Margaret G. (1995). "Kentropyx borckiana (Squamata, Teiidae): a unisexual lizard of hybrid origin in the Guiana region, South America". American Museum Novitates (3145): 1–23. 

Peters W (1869). "Eine Mittheilung über neue Gattungen und Arten von Eidechsen". Monatsberichte der Königlich Preussischen Akademie der Wissenschaften zu Berlin 1869: 57–66. (Centropyx borckiana, new species, p. 4). (in German).

External links

Kentropyx borckiana at the Encyclopedia of Life
Kentropyx borckiana at the Reptile Database

borckiana
Reptiles of Guyana
Reptiles of French Guiana
Reptiles of Suriname
Reptiles of Barbados
Lizards of the Caribbean
Lizards of South America
Reptiles described in 1869
Taxa named by Wilhelm Peters